Tseminyü is the headquarters of the Tseminyü District of Indian state of Nagaland.

References 

Geography of Nagaland